Haňovice is a municipality and village in Olomouc District in the Olomouc Region of the Czech Republic. It has about 500 inhabitants.

Administrative parts
The village of Kluzov is an administrative part of Haňovice.

History
The first written mention of Haňovice is from 1141.

References

Villages in Olomouc District